The Turkish War of Independence (19 May 1919 – 24 July 1923) was a series of military campaigns waged by the Turkish National Movement after parts of the Ottoman Empire were occupied and partitioned following its defeat in World War I. These campaigns were directed against Greece in the west, Armenia in the east, France in the south, loyalists and separatists in various cities, and British and Ottoman troops around Constantinople (İstanbul).

The ethnic demographics of the modern Turkish Republic were significantly impacted by the earlier Armenian genocide and the deportations of Greek-speaking, Orthodox Christian Rum people. The Turkish nationalist movement carried out massacres and deportations to eliminate native Christian populations—a continuation of the Armenian genocide and other ethnic cleansing operations during World War I. Following these campaigns of ethnic cleansing the historic Christian presence in Anatolia was destroyed, in large part, and the Muslim demographic had increased from 80% to 98%.

While World War I ended for the Ottoman Empire with the Armistice of Mudros, the Allied Powers continued occupying and seizing land for imperialist designs, as well as to prosecute former members of the Committee of Union and Progress and those involved in the Armenian genocide. Ottoman military commanders therefore refused orders from both the Allies and the Ottoman government to surrender and disband their forces. This crisis reached a head when sultan Mehmed VI dispatched Mustafa Kemal Pasha (Atatürk), a well-respected and high-ranking general, to Anatolia to restore order; however, Mustafa Kemal became an enabler and eventually leader of Turkish nationalist resistance against the Ottoman government, Allied powers, and Christian minorities.

In an attempt to establish control over the power vacuum in Anatolia, the Allies persuaded Greek Prime Minister Eleftherios Venizelos to launch an expeditionary force into Anatolia and occupy Smyrna (İzmir), beginning the Turkish War of Independence. A nationalist counter government led by Mustafa Kemal was established in Ankara when it became clear the Ottoman government was backing the Allied powers. The Allies soon pressured the Ottoman government in Constantinople into suspending the Constitution, shuttering the Parliament, and signing the Treaty of Sèvres, a treaty unfavorable to Turkish interests that the "Ankara government" declared illegal.

In the ensuing war, irregular militia defeated the French forces in the south, and undemobilized units went on to partition Armenia with Bolshevik forces, resulting in the Treaty of Kars (October 1921). The Western Front of the independence war was known as the Greco-Turkish War, in which Greek forces at first encountered unorganized resistance. However İsmet Pasha's organization of militia into a regular army paid off when Ankara forces fought the Greeks in the Battles of First and Second İnönü. The Greek army emerged victorious in the Battle of Kütahya-Eskişehir and decided to drive on the nationalist capital of Ankara, stretching their supply lines. The Turks checked their advance in the Battle of Sakarya and counter-attacked in the Great Offensive, which expelled Greek forces from Anatolia in the span of three weeks. The war effectively ended with the recapture of İzmir and the Chanak Crisis, prompting the signing of another armistice in Mudanya.

The Grand National Assembly in Ankara was recognized as the legitimate Turkish government, which signed the Treaty of Lausanne (July 1923), a treaty more favorable to Turkey than the Sèvres Treaty. The Allies evacuated Anatolia and Eastern Thrace, the Ottoman government was overthrown and the monarchy abolished, and the Grand National Assembly of Turkey (which remains Turkey's primary legislative body today) declared the Republic of Turkey on 29 October 1923. With the war, a population exchange between Greece and Turkey, the partitioning of the Ottoman Empire, and the abolition of the sultanate, the Ottoman era came to an end, and with Atatürk's reforms, the Turks created the modern, secular nation-state of Turkey. On 3 March 1924, the Ottoman caliphate was also abolished.

Prelude: October 1918 – May 1919

Conclusion of World War I 

In the summer months of 1918, the leaders of the Central Powers realized that World War I was lost, including the Ottomans'. Almost simultaneously the Palestinian Front and then the Macedonian Front collapsed. The sudden decision by Bulgaria to sign an armistice cut communications from Constantinople (İstanbul) to Vienna and Berlin, and opened the undefended Ottoman capital to Entente attack. With the major fronts crumbling, Grand Vizier Talât Pasha intended to sign an armistice, and resigned on 8 October 1918 so that a new government would receive less harsh armistice terms. The Armistice of Mudros was signed on 30 October 1918, ending World War I for the Ottoman Empire. Three days later, the Committee of Union and Progress (CUP)—which governed the Ottoman Empire as a one-party state since 1913—held its last congress, where it was decided the party would be dissolved. Talât, Enver Pasha, Cemal Pasha, and five other high-ranking members of the CUP escaped the Ottoman Empire on a German torpedo boat later that night, plunging the country into a power vacuum.

The armistice was signed because the Ottoman Empire had been defeated in important fronts, but the military was intact and retreated in good order. Unlike other Central Powers, the Allies did not mandate the Ottoman Army to dissolve its general staff. Though the army suffered from mass desertion through out the war which lead to banditry, there was no threat of mutiny or revolutions like in Germany, Austria-Hungary, or Russia. Due to the Turkish nationalist policies pursued by the CUP against Ottoman Christians and the dismemberment of the Arab provinces, by 1918 the Ottoman Empire held control over a mostly homogeneous land of Muslim Turks (and Kurds) from Eastern Thrace to the Persian border, though with sizable Greek and Armenian minorities still within its borders.

Armistice of Mudros and prelude to resistance 
On 30 October 1918, the Armistice of Mudros was signed between the Ottoman Empire and the Allies of World War I, bringing hostilities in the Middle Eastern theatre of World War I to an end. The Ottoman Army was to demobilize, its navy and air force handed to the Allies, and occupied territory in the Caucasus and Persia to be evacuated. Article VII granted the Allies the right to occupy forts controlling the Turkish Straits (to assist the White Russians in their struggle against the Bolsheviks); and the vague right to occupy "in case of disorder" any territory if there were a threat to security, this was to follow through the charges of crimes against humanity orchestrated by the CUP government against Armenian Ottomans. For now, the House of Osman escaped the fates of the Hohenzollerns, Habsburgs, and Romanovs to continue ruling their empire, though at the cost of its remaining sovereignty.On 13 November 1918, a French brigade entered Constantinople to begin a de facto occupation of the Ottoman capital and its immediate dependencies. This was followed by a fleet consisting of British, French, Italian and Greek ships deploying soldiers on the ground the next day, totaling 50,000 troops in Constantinople. The Allied Powers stated that the occupation was temporary and its purpose was to protect the monarchy, the Caliphate and the minorities. Somerset Arthur Gough-Calthorpe—the British signatory of the Mudros Armistice—stated the Triple Entente's public position that they had no intention to dismantle the Ottoman government or place it under military occupation by "occupying Constantinople". However, dismantling the government and partitioning the Ottoman Empire among the Allied nations had been an objective of the Entente since the start of WWI.

Greek and Armenian refugees were also to be sent back to their homes that they were forced from under the CUP, but most found their old homes inhabited by equally desperate Rumelian Muslim refugees from the Balkan Wars settled in their properties during the First World War. Ethnic conflict restarted in Ottoman land, especially in the Black Sea, Aegean, Eastern Anatolian and Central Anatolian regions; government officials responsible for resettling Christian refugees often assisted Muslim refugees in these disputes, prompting European powers to continue bringing Ottoman territory under their control.

A wave of seizures took place in the rest of the country in the following months. Citing Article VII, British forces demanded that Turkish troops evacuate Mosul, claiming that Christian civilians in Mosul and Zakho were killed en masse. On 14 November, joint Franco-Greek troops occupied the town of Uzunköprü in Eastern Thrace as well as the railway axis until the train station of Hadımköy on the outskirts of Constantinople. On 1 December, British troops based in Syria occupied Kilis, Maraş, Urfa and Birecik. Beginning in December, French troops began successive seizures of Ottoman territory in Cilicia, including the towns of Antakya, Mersin, Tarsus, Ceyhan, Adana, Osmaniye, and İslâhiye while French forces embarked by gunboats and sent troops to the Black Sea ports of Zonguldak and Karadeniz Ereğli commanding Turkey's coal mining region. These continued seizures of land prompted Ottoman commanders to refuse demobilization and prepare for renewed conflict.

The British similarly asked Mustafa Kemal Pasha to turn over the port of Alexandretta (İskenderun), which he reluctantly did, following which he was recalled to Constantinople. He made sure to distribute weapons to the population to prevent them from falling into the hands of Allied forces. Some of these weapons were smuggled to the east by members of Karakol, a successor to the Special Organization, to be used in case resistance was necessary in Anatolia. Many Ottoman officials participated in efforts to conceal from the occupying authorities details of the burgeoning independence movement spreading throughout Anatolia.

Other commanders began refusing orders from the Ottoman government and the Allied powers. After Mustafa Kemal Pasha returned to Constantinople, Ali Fuat Pasha (Cebesoy) brought XX Corps under his command. He marched first to Konya and then to Ankara to organise resistance groups, such as the Circassian çetes he assembled with guerilla leader Çerkes Ethem. Meanwhile, Kazım Karabekir Pasha refused to surrender his intact and powerful XV Corps in Erzurum.

The Armistice Era 
Following the occupation of Constantinople, Mehmed VI Vahdettin dissolved the Chamber of Deputies which was dominated by Unionists elected back in 1914, promising elections for the next year. Vahdettin just ascended to the throne only months earlier with the death of Mehmed V Reşad. He was disgusted with the policies of the CUP, and wished to be a more assertive Sultan than his diseased half brother. Greek and Armenian Ottomans declared the termination of their relationship with the Ottoman Empire through their respective patriarchates, and refused to partake in any future election.

A general amnesty was soon issued, allowing the exiled and imprisoned dissidents persecuted by the CUP to return to Constantinople. Mehmed VI invited the pro-Palace politician Damat Ferid Pasha, leader of the reconstituted Freedom and Accord Party, to form a government, whose members quickly set out to purge the Unionists from the Ottoman government. Ferid Pasha hoped that his Anglophilia and an attitude of appeasement would induce less harsh peace terms from the Allied powers. However his appointment was problematic for nationalists, many being members of the liquidated committee that were surely to face sentencing. Years of corruption, unconstitutional acts, war profiteering, and enrichment from ethnic cleansing and genocide by the Unionists soon became basis of war crimes trials and courts martial trials held in Constantinople. While many leading Unionists were sentenced to death, most made sure to escape the country before Allied occupation or to regions that the government now had minimal control over thus most they were sentenced in absentia. These trials lacked political will and were unpopular with Turkish Muslims. Only one person was executed for the Armenian genocide, the Kaymakam of Boğazlıyan district Mehmed Kemal, whose hanging lead to a demonstration against the courts martials trials.

Elsewhere in the country, regional nationalist resistance organizations known as Şuras –meaning "councils", not unlike soviets in revolutionary Russia– were founded, most pledging allegiance to the Defence of National Rights movement that protested continued Allied occupation and appeasement by the Sublime Porte.

Mustafa Kemal's mission 
With Anatolia in practical anarchy and the Ottoman army being questionably loyal in reaction to Allied land seizures Mehmed VI established the military inspectorate system to reestablish authority over the remaining empire. Encouraged by Karabekir and Edmund Allenby, he assigned Mustafa Kemal Pasha (Atatürk) as the inspector of the Ninth Army Troops Inspectorate –based in Erzurum– to restore order to Ottoman military units and to improve internal security on 30 April 1919. Mustafa Kemal was a well known, well respected, and well connected army commander, with much prestige coming from his status as the "Hero of Anafartalar"—for his role in the Gallipoli Campaign—and his title of "Honorary Aide-de-camp to His Majesty Sultan" gained in the last months of WWI. He was a nationalist and a fierce critic of the government's accommodating policy to the Entente powers. Even though he was a member of the CUP, he frequently clashed with the Central Committee during war and was therefore sidelined to the periphery of power, meaning he was the most legitimate nationalist for Mehmed VI to placate. In this new political climate, he sought to capitalize on his war exploits to attain a better job, indeed several times he unsuccessfully lobbied for his inclusion in cabinet as War Minister. His new assignment gave him effective plenipotentiary powers over all of Anatolia which was meant to accommodate him and other nationalists to keep them loyal to the government.

Mustafa Kemal had earlier declined to become the leader of the Sixth Army headquartered in Nusaybin. But according to Patrick Balfour, through manipulation and the help of friends and sympathizers, he became the inspector of virtually all of the Ottoman forces in Anatolia, tasked with overseeing the disbanding process of remaining Ottoman forces. Kemal had an abundance of connections and personal friends concentrated in the post-armistice Ottoman War Ministry, a powerful tool that would help him accomplish his secret goal: to lead a nationalist movement against the Allied powers and a collaborative Ottoman government.

The day before his departure to Samsun on the remote Black Sea coast, Kemal had one last audience with Mehmed VI. He pledged his loyalty to the sultan-caliph and they were also informed of the occupation of Smyrna (İzmir) by the Greeks. He and his carefully selected staff left Constantinople aboard the old steamer  on the evening of 16 May 1919.

Negotiations for Ottoman partition 

On 19 January 1919, the Paris Peace Conference was first held, at which Allied nations set the peace terms for the defeated Central Powers, including the Ottoman Empire. As a special body of the Paris Conference, "The Inter-Allied Commission on Mandates in Turkey", was established to pursue the secret treaties they had signed between 1915 and 1917. Italy sought control over the southern part of Anatolia under the Agreement of St.-Jean-de-Maurienne. France expected to exercise control over Hatay, Lebanon, Syria, and a portion of southeastern Anatolia based on the Sykes–Picot Agreement.

Greece justified their territorial claims of Ottoman land through the Megali Idea as well as international sympathy from the suffering of Ottoman Greeks in 1914 and 1917–1918. Privately, Greek prime minister Eleftherios Venizelos had British prime minister David Lloyd George's backing not least from Greece's entrance to WWI on the Allied side, but also from an electric personality. His demands included parts of Eastern Thrace, the islands of Imbros (Gökçeada), Tenedos (Bozcaada), and parts of Western Anatolia around the city of Smyrna (İzmir), all of which had large Greek populations. Venizelos also advocated a large Armenian state to check a post-war Ottoman Empire. Greece wanted to incorporate Constantinople, but Entente powers did not give permission. Damat Ferid Pasha went to Paris on behalf of the Ottoman Empire hoping to minimize territorial losses using Fourteen Points rhetoric, but returned empty handed.

At the Paris Peace Conference, competing claims over Western Anatolia by Greek and Italian delegations led Greece to land the flagship of the Greek Navy at Smyrna, resulting in the Italian delegation walking out of the peace talks. On 30 April, Italy responded to the possible idea of Greek incorporation of Western Anatolia by sending a warship to Smyrna as a show of force against the Greek campaign. A large Italian force also landed in Antalya. Faced with Italian annexation of parts of Asia Minor with a significant ethnic Greek population, Venizelos secured Allied permission for Greek troops to land in Smyrna, ostensibly as a peacekeeping force to protect the civilian population from ethnic conflict. Venizelos's rhetoric was more directed against the Ottoman CUP regime than the Turks, an attitude not always shared in the Greek military: "Greece is not making war against Islam, but against the anachronistic [İttihadist] Government, and its corrupt, ignominious, and bloody administration, with a view to the expelling it from those territories where the majority of the population consists of Greeks." It was decided by the Triple Entente that Greece would control a zone around Smyrna and Ayvalık in western Asia Minor.

Organizational phase: May 1919 – March 1920

Greek landing at Smyrna 

Most historians mark the Greek landing at Smyrna on 15 May 1919 as the start date of the Turkish War of Independence as well as the start of the Kuva-yi Milliye Phase. The occupation ceremony from the outset was tense from nationalist fervor, with Ottoman Greeks greeting the soldiers with an ecstatic welcome, and Ottoman Muslims protesting the landing. A miscommunication in Greek high command lead to an Evzone column marching by the municipal Turkish barracks. The nationalist journalist Hasan Tahsin fired the "first bullet" at the Greek standard bearer at the head of the troops, turning the city into a warzone. Süleyman Fethi Bey was murdered by bayonet for refusing to shout "Zito Venizelos" (meaning "long live Venizelos"), and 300–400 unarmed Turkish soldiers and civilians and 100 Greek soldiers and civilians were killed or wounded.

Greek troops moved from Smyrna outwards to towns on the Karaburun peninsula; to Selçuk, situated a hundred kilometres south of Smyrna at a key location that commands the fertile Küçük Menderes River valley; and to Menemen towards the north. Guerilla warfare commenced in the countryside, as Turks began to organize themselves into irregular guerilla groups known as Kuva-yi Milliye (national forces), which were soon joined by deserting Ottoman soldiers. Most Kuva-yi Milliye bands were led by known military commanders as well as members of the Special Organization. The Greek troops based in cosmopolitan Smyrna soon found themselves conducting counterinsurgency operations in a hostile, dominantly Muslim hinterland. Groups of Ottoman Greeks also formed Greek nationalist militias and cooperated with the Greek Army to combat Kuva-yi Milliye within the zone of control. A massacre of Turks at Menemen was followed up with a battle for the town of Aydın, which resulted in intense intercommunal violence between both communities and the razing of the city. What was supposed to be a peacekeeping mission of Western Anatolia instead inflamed ethnic tensions and became a counterinsurgency.

The reaction of Greek landing at Smyrna and continued Allied seizures of land served to destabilize Turkish civil society. The Ottoman government, including most of the Turkish bourgeoisie, trusted the Allies to bring peace, and thought the terms offered at Mudros were considerably more lenient than they actually were. Pushback was potent in the capital, with 23 May 1919 being largest of the Sultanahmet Square demonstrations by Turks in Constantinople against the Greek occupation of Smyrna, the largest act of civil disobedience in Turkish history at that point.

Organizing resistance 

Mustafa Kemal Pasha and his colleagues stepped ashore in Samsun on 19 May and set up their first quarters in the Mıntıka Palace Hotel. British troops were present in Samsun, and he initially maintained cordial contact. He had assured Damat Ferid about the army's loyalty towards the new government in Constantinople. However behind the government's back, Kemal made the people of Samsun aware of the Greek and Italian landings, staged discreet mass meetings, made fast connections via telegraph with the army units in Anatolia, and began to form links with various nationalist groups. He sent telegrams of protest to foreign embassies and the War Ministry about British reinforcements in the area and about British aid to Greek brigand gangs. After a week in Samsun, Kemal and his staff moved to Havza. It was there that he first showed the flag of the resistance.

Mustafa Kemal wrote in his memoir that he needed nationwide support to justify armed resistance against the Allied occupation. His credentials and the importance of his position were not enough to inspire everyone. While officially occupied with the disarming of the army, he met with various contacts in order to build his movement's momentum. He met with Rauf Pasha, Karabekir Pasha, Ali Fuat Pasha, and Refet Pasha and issued the Amasya Circular (22 June 1919). Ottoman provincial authorities were notified via telegraph that the unity and independence of the nation was at risk, and that the government in Constantinople was compromised. To remedy this, a congress was to take place in Erzurum between delegates of the Six Vilayets to decide on a response, and another congress would take place in Sivas where every Vilayet should send delegates. Sympathy and an lack of coordination from the capital gave Mustafa Kemal freedom of movement and telegraph use despite his implied anti-government tone.

On 23 June, High Commissioner Admiral Calthorpe, realising the significance of Mustafa Kemal's discreet activities in Anatolia, sent a report about the Pasha to the Foreign Office. His remarks were downplayed by George Kidson of the Eastern Department. Captain Hurst of the British occupation force in Samsun warned Admiral Calthorpe one more time, but Hurst's units were replaced with the Brigade of Gurkhas. When the British landed in Alexandretta, Admiral Calthorpe resigned on the basis that this was against the armistice that he had signed and was assigned to another position on 5 August 1919. The movement of British units alarmed the population of the region and convinced them that Mustafa Kemal was right.

Consolidation through congresses 
By early July, Mustafa Kemal Pasha received telegrams from the sultan and Calthorpe, asking him and Refet to cease his activities in Anatolia and return to the capital. Kemal was in Erzincan and did not want to return to Constantinople, concerned that the foreign authorities might have designs for him beyond the sultan's plans. Before resigning from his position, he dispatched a circular to all nationalist organizations and military commanders to not disband or surrender unless for the latter if they could be replaced by cooperative nationalist commanders. Now only a civilian stripped of his command, Mustafa Kemal was at the mercy of the new inspector of Third Army (renamed from Ninth Army) Karabekir Pasha, indeed the War Ministry ordered him to arrest Kemal, an order which Karabekir refused.

The Erzurum Congress was held on the anniversary of the Young Turk Revolution as a meeting of delegates and governors from the six Eastern Vilayets. They drafted the National Pact (Misak-ı Millî), which set out key decisions of Turkish national self-determination per Woodrow Wilson's Fourteen Points, the security of Constantinople, and the abolition of the Ottoman capitulations. The Erzurum Congress concluded with a circular that was effectively a declaration of independence: All regions within Ottoman borders upon the signing of the Mudros Armistice were indivisible from the Ottoman state and assistance from any country not coveting Ottoman territory was welcome. If the government in Constantinople was not able to attain this after electing a new parliament, they insisted a provisional government should be promulgated to defend Turkish sovereignty. The Committee of Representation was established as a provisional executive body based in Anatolia, with Mustafa Kemal Pasha as its chairman.Following the congress, the Committee of Representation relocated to Sivas. As announced in the Amasya Circular, a new congress was held there in September with delegates from all Ottoman provinces. The Sivas Congress repeated the points of the National Pact agreed to in Erzurum, and united the various regional Defence of National Rights Associations organizations, into a united political organisation: Association of the Defence of National Rights of Anatolia and Rumelia (ADNRAR), with Mustafa Kemal as its chairman. In an effort show his movement was a in fact a new and unifying movement, the delegates had to swear an oath to discontinue their relations with the CUP and to never revive the party (despite most in Sivas being previous members). It was also decided there that the Ottoman Empire should not be a League of Nations mandate under the United States, especially after the U.S Senate failed to ratify American membership in the League.

Momentum was now on the nationalists' side. A plot by a loyalist Ottoman governor to arrest Kemal before the Sivas Congress lead to the cutting of all ties with the Ottoman government until a new election would be held in the lower house of parliament, the Chamber of Deputies. In October 1919, the last Ottoman governor loyal to Constantinople fled his province. Fearing the outbreak of hostilities, British troops evacuated from the Black Sea coast and Kütahya. Damat Ferid Pasha resigned, and the sultan replaced him with a general with nationalist credentials: Ali Rıza Pasha. On 16 October 1919, Ali Rıza and the nationalists held negotiations in Amasya. They agreed in the Amasya Protocol that an election would be called for the Ottoman Parliament to establish national unity by upholding the resolutions made in the Sivas Congress, including the National Pact.

By October 1919, the Ottoman government only held de facto control over Constantinople; the rest of the Ottoman Empire was loyal to Kemal's movement to resist a partition of Anatolia and Thrace. Within a few months Mustafa Kemal went from General Inspector of the Ninth Army to a renegade military commander discharged for insubordination to leading a homegrown anti-Entente movement that overthrew a government and driven it into resistance.

Last Ottoman parliament 

In December 1919, an election was held for the Ottoman parliament that was boycotted by Ottoman Greeks, Ottoman Armenians and the Freedom and Accord Party, resulting in the domination of a pro–ADNRAR group. Mustafa Kemal was elected an MP from Erzurum, but he expected the Allies neither to accept the Harbord report nor to respect his parliamentary immunity if he went to the Ottoman capital, hence he remained in Anatolia. Mustafa Kemal and the Committee of Representation moved from Sivas to Ankara so that he could keep in touch with as many deputies as possible as they traveled to Constantinople to attend the parliament.

Though Ali Rıza Pasha called the election as per the Amasya Protocol to keep unity between the "Istanbul government" and "Ankara government", he was wrong to think the election could bring him any legitimacy. The Ottoman parliament was under the de facto control of the British battalion stationed at Constantinople and any decisions by the parliament had to have the signatures of both Ali Rıza Pasha and the battalion's commanding officer. The only laws that passed were those acceptable to, or specifically ordered by the British.

On 12 January 1920, the last session of the Chamber of Deputies met in the capital. First the sultan's speech was presented, and then a telegram from Mustafa Kemal, manifesting the claim that the rightful government of Turkey was in Ankara in the name of the Committee of Representation. On 28 January the MPs secretly met to pass the National Pact. Proposals were also made to elect Kemal president of the Chamber, however this was deferred in the certain knowledge that the British would prorogue the Chamber. The Chamber of Deputies would be forcefully dissolved for passing the National Pact anyway. The National Pact solidified nationalist notions, which were in conflict with the Allied plans.

From February to April, leaders of Britain, France, and Italy met in London to discuss the partitioning of the Ottoman Empire and the crisis in Anatolia. The British began to sense that the elected Ottoman government was becoming less cooperative with the Allies and independently minded. The Ottoman government was not doing all that it could to suppress the nationalists. Mustafa Kemal manufactured a crisis to pressure on the Istanbul government to pick a side by deploying Kuva-yi Milliye towards İzmit. The British, concerned about the security of the Bosporus Strait, demanded Ali Rıza Pasha to reassert control over the area, to which he responded with his resignation to the sultan. His successor Salih Hulusi declared Mustafa Kemal's struggle legitimate, and also resigned, less than a month in office.

Jurisdictional conflict: March 1920 – January 1921

Dissolution of the Ottoman Parliament

As they were negotiating the partition of the Ottoman Empire, the Allies were growing increasingly concerned about the Turkish National Movement. To this end, the Allied occupational authorities in Istanbul began planning a raid to arrest nationalist politicians and journalists along with occupying military and police installations and government buildings. On 16 March 1920, the raid was carried out; several Royal Navy warships were anchored in the Galata Bridge to support British forces, including the Indian Army, while they carried out the arrests and occupied several government buildings in the early hours of the morning.

An Indian Army operation, the Şehzadebaşı raid, resulted in 5 Ottoman soldiers from the 10th Infantry Division being killed when troops raided their barracks. Among those arrested included senior leadership of the Turkish National Movement and former members of the CUP. 150 arrested Turkish politicians accused of war crimes were interned in Malta and became known as the Malta exiles.

Mustafa Kemal was ready for this move. He warned all the nationalist organisations that there would be misleading declarations from the capital. He warned that the only way to counter Allied movements was to organise protests. He declared "Today the Turkish nation is called to defend its capacity for civilization, its right to life and independenceits entire future". Kemal was extensively familiar with the Arab Revolt and British involvement. He managed to stay one step ahead of the occupying Allies. This—as well as his other abilities—gave him considerable authority among the revolutionaries.

On 18 March, the Chamber of Deputies declared that it was unacceptable to arrest five of its members, and dissolved itself. Mehmed VI confirmed this and declared the end of Constitutional Monarchy and a return to absolutism. With the lower elected Chamber of Deputies shuttered, the Constitution terminated, and the capital occupied; Mehmed VI, his cabinet, and the appointed Senate were all that was left of the Ottoman government. The dissolution of the Ottoman Parliament had left the sultan as the sole political authority of the Empire. But the sultan depended on British support to maintain control over what was left of the empire. By April 1920, the Sublime Porte only had effective control over the city of Istanbul, as its capitulation gave Mustafa Kemal legitimacy to be the sole representative of the Turkish people, and consolidated his position as the leader of Turkish resistance against the Allies.

Promulgation of the Grand National Assembly

The strong measures taken against the nationalists by the Allies in March 1920 began a distinct new phase of the conflict. Mustafa Kemal sent a note to the governors and force commanders, asking them to conduct elections to provide delegates for a new parliament to represent the Ottoman (Turkish) people, which would convene in Ankara. Mustafa Kemal appealed to the Islamic world, asking for help to make sure that everyone knew he was still fighting in the name of the sultan who was also the caliph. He stated he wanted to free the caliph from the Allies. Plans were made to organise a new government and parliament in Ankara, and then ask the sultan to accept its authority.

A flood of supporters moved to Ankara just ahead of the Allied dragnets. Included among them were Halide Edip and Abdülhak Adnan (Adıvar), Mustafa İsmet Pasha (İnönü), Mustafa Fevzi Pasha (Çakmak), many of Kemal's allies in the Ministry of War, and Celalettin Arif, the president of the now shuttered Chamber of Deputies. Celaleddin Arif's desertion of the capital was of great significance, as he declared that the Ottoman Parliament had been dissolved illegally.

Some 100 members of the Ottoman Parliament were able to escape the Allied roundup and joined 190 deputies elected around the country by the national resistance group. In March 1920, Turkish revolutionaries announced the establishment of a new parliament in Ankara known as the Grand National Assembly (GNA). The GNA assumed full governmental powers. On 23 April, the new Assembly gathered for the first time, making Mustafa Kemal its first Speaker and Prime Minister and İsmet Pasha, Chief of the General Staff. The parliament was dominated by the ADNRAR. This was not an unprecedented situation in Ottoman politics, only 11 years earlier, Talât Pasha established a counter parliament in Aya Stefanos (Yeşilköy) when reactionaries revolted in Constantinople and took control of the government in the 31 March Incident, resulting in the deposition of the sultan.

Hoping to undermine the national movement, Mehmed VI passed a fatwa to qualify the Turkish revolutionaries as infidels, calling for the death of its leaders. The fatwa stated that true believers should not go along with the nationalist (rebels) movement. The mufti of Ankara Rifat Börekçi issued a simultaneous fatwa, declaring that the Constantinople was under the control of the Entente and the Ferid Pasha government. In this text, the nationalist movement's goal was stated as freeing the sultanate and the caliphate from its enemies. In reaction to the desertion of several prominent figures to the Nationalist Movement, Ferid Pasha ordered Halide Edip, Ali Fuat and Mustafa Kemal to be sentenced to death in absentia for treason.

Clashes at İzmit 

On 28 April the sultan raised 4,000 soldiers known as the Kuva-yi İnzibatiye (Caliphate Army) to combat the nationalists. Then using money from the Allies, another force about 2,000 strong from non-Muslim inhabitants were initially deployed in İznik. The sultan's government sent the forces under the name of the caliphate army to the revolutionaries to arouse counterrevolutionary sympathy. The British, being skeptical of how formidable these insurgents were, decided to use irregular power to counteract the revolutionaries. The nationalist forces were distributed all around Turkey, so many smaller units were dispatched to face them. In İzmit there were two battalions of the British army. These units were to be used to rout the partisans under the command of Ali Fuat and Refet Pasha.

Anatolia had many competing forces on its soil: British battalions, nationalist militia (Kuva-yi Milliye), the sultan's army (Kuva-yi İnzibatiye), and Ahmet Anzavur's forces. On 13 April 1920, an uprising supported by Anzavur against the GNA occurred at Düzce as a direct consequence of the fatwa. Within days the rebellion spread to Bolu and Gerede. The movement engulfed northwestern Anatolia for about a month. On 14 June, Kuva-yi Milliye faced fought a pitched battle near İzmit against the Kuva-yi İnzibatiye, Anzavur's bands, and British units. Yet under heavy attack some of the Kuva-yi İnzibatiye deserted and joined the nationalist militia. This revealed the sultan did not have the unwavering support of his own men. Meanwhile, the rest of these forces withdrew behind the British lines which held their position.

The clash outside İzmit brought serious consequences. British forces conducted combat operations on the nationalists and the Royal Air Force carried out aerial bombardments against the positions, which forced nationalist forces to temporarily retreat to more secure missions. The British commander in Turkey, General George Milne—, asked for reinforcements. This led to a study to determine what would be required to defeat the Turkish nationalists. The report, signed by French Field Marshal Ferdinand Foch, concluded that 27 divisions were necessary, but the British army did not have 27 divisions to spare. Also, a deployment of this size could have disastrous political consequences back home. World War I had just ended, and the British public would not support another lengthy and costly expedition.

The British accepted the fact that a nationalist movement could not be defeated without deployment of consistent and well-trained forces. On 25 June, the forces originating from Kuva-i İnzibatiye were dismantled under British supervision. The British realised that the best option to overcome these Turkish nationalists was to use a force that was battle-tested and fierce enough to fight the Turks on their own soil. The British had to look no further than Turkey's neighbor: Greece.

Treaty of Sèvres 

Eleftherios Venizelos, pessimistic of the rapidly deteriorating situation in Anatolia, requested to the Allies that a peace treaty be drawn up with the hope that fighting would stop. Mehmed VI affirmed Ferid Pasha's signature of the subsequent treaty in Sèvres in August 1920. It confirmed the Arab Vilayets of the empire would be reorganized into new nations given to Britain and France in the form of Mandates by the League of Nations, while Anatolia would be partitioned between Greece, Italy, Syria (under French mandate), Iraq (under British mandate), Armenia (potentially under an American mandate), and Georgia. The old capital of Constantinople as well as the Dardanelles would be under international League of Nations control, while the Ottoman Empire would remain a rump state based in Northern Anatolia.

However the treaty would never come into effect. While the Allies signed the treaty, the Ottoman government and Greece never ratified it. Though Ferid Pasha signed the treaty, the Ottoman Senate, the upper house with seats appointed by the sultan, refused to ratify the treaty, demonstrating the clout of Kemal's movement in the Ottoman government. Greece disagreed on the borders drawn.

Kemal's GNA Government responded to the Treaty of Sèvres by promulgating a new constitution in January 1921. The resulting constitution consecrated the principle of popular sovereignty; authority not deriving from the unelected sultan, but from the Turkish people who elect governments representative of their interests. This document became the legal basis for the war of independence by the GNA, as the sultan's signature of the Treaty of Sèvres would be unconstitutional as his position was not elected. While the constitution did not specify a future role of the sultan, the document gave Kemal ever more legitimacy in the eyes of Turks for justified resistance against Istanbul.

Fronts

Southern Front 

In contrast to the Eastern and Western fronts, it was mostly unorganized Kuva-yi Milliye which were fighting in the Southern Front, against France. The French wanted to take control of Syria and Cilicia. The initial landing were by the French Armenian Legion and the French cooperated with Armenian militia. Turkish nationalists also cooperated with Faysil's self-proclaimed Arab Kingdom of Syria.

Kuva-yi Milliye also engaged with British forces in the "Al-Jazira Front," primarily in Mosul. Another self-declared monarch, Mahmud Barzanji of the Kingdom of Kurdistan, attempted to control the region for himself, at various times playing the Nationalists and the British against each other. Even after the war, the status of Mosul was not determined until a 1926 plebiscite. Both aspiring sovereigns were previous belligerants against the Ottoman Empire, but reconciled with the Turks to some degree for pragmatic reasons as they were similarly fighting anti-colonial struggles.

Eastern Front 

The border of newly independent Armenia and the Ottoman Empire was defined in the Treaty of Brest-Litovsk (3 March 1918) after the Bolshevik revolution, and later by the Treaty of Batum (4 June 1918). It was obvious that after the Armistice of Mudros (30 October 1918) the eastern border was not going to stay as it was drawn. There were talks going on with the Armenian Diaspora and Allied Powers on reshaping the border. The Fourteen Points was seen as an incentive to Armenia, if the Armenians could prove that they were the majority of the population and that they had military control over the eastern regions. The Armenian movements on the borders were being used as an argument to redraw the border between the Ottoman Empire and Armenia. Woodrow Wilson agreed to transfer the territories back to the Armenia on the principle that they were dominated by Armenians. The results of these talks were to be reflected on the Treaty of Sèvres (10 August 1920).

One of the most important fights had taken place on this border. The very early onset of a national army was proof of this, even though there was a pressing Greek danger to the west. The stage of the eastern campaign developed through Kâzım Karabekir Pasha's two reports (30 May and 4 June 1920) outlining the situation in the region. He was detailing the activities of the Armenian Republic and advising on how to shape the resources on the eastern borders, especially in Erzurum. The Russian government sent a message to settle not only the Armenian but also the Iranian border through diplomacy under Russian control. Soviet support was absolutely vital for the Turkish nationalist movement, as Turkey was underdeveloped and had no domestic armaments industry. Bakir Sami (Kunduh) was assigned to the talks. The Bolsheviks demanded that Van and Bitlis be transferred to Armenia. This was unacceptable to the Turkish revolutionaries.

The Treaty of Alexandropol (2—3 December 1920) was the first treaty (although illegitimate) signed by the Turkish revolutionaries. It was supposed to nullify the Armenian activities on the eastern border, which was reflected in the Treaty of Sèvres as a succession of regions named Wilsonian Armenia. The 10th article in the Treaty of Alexandropol stated that Armenia renounced the Treaty of Sèvres. The agreement was signed with representatives of the former government of Armenia, which by that time had no de jure or de facto power in Armenia, since Soviet rule was already established in the country.

After the peace agreement with the Turkish nationalists, in late November, a Soviet-backed Communist uprising took place in Armenia. On 28 November 1920, the 11th Red Army under the command of Anatoliy Gekker crossed over into Armenia from Soviet Azerbaijan. The Soviet-Armenian war lasted only a week. After their defeat by the Turkish revolutionaries the Armenians were no longer a threat to the Nationalist cause. On 16 March 1921, the Bolsheviks and Turkey signed a more comprehensive agreement, the Treaty of Kars, which involved representatives of Soviet Armenia, Soviet Azerbaijan, and Soviet Georgia.

Western Front 
The Greco-Turkish War—referred to as the "Western Front" by the Turks and the "Asia Minor Campaign" by the Greeks—started when Greek forces landed in Smyrna (now İzmir), on 15 May 1919. A perimeter around the city known as the Milne Line was established in which low intensity guerilla war commenced.

The conflict escalated when Greece and Britain performed a joint offensive over the summer of 1920 that took control over the Marmara coast and provided strategic depth to the Izmir occupation zone. The cities of İzmit, Manisa, Balıkesir, Aydın, and Bursa were taken without much Turkish resistance.

A second Greek offensive in autumn was launched with the goal to pressure Istanbul and Ankara to sign the Sèvres Treaty. This peace process was temporarily halted with the fall of Venizelos when the pro-Entente King Alexander died from sepsis after being bitten by a monkey. Much to Allied chagrin he was replaced by his anti-Entente father King Constantine. Greece ceased to receive much allied support after the change in power. The Army of Asia Minor was purged of Venizelist officers, their replacements being less competent.

When the offensive resumed, the Turks received their first victory when the Greeks encountered stiff resistance in the battles of First and Second İnönü, due to İsmet Pasha's organization of an irregular militia into a regular army. The two victories led to Allied proposals to amend the Treaty of Sèvres where both Ankara and Istanbul were represented, but Greece refused. With the conclusion of the Southern and Eastern fronts, Ankara was able to concentrate more forces on the West against the Greeks. They also began to receive support from Soviet Union, as well as France and Italy, who sought to check British influence in the Near East.

June–July 1921 saw heavy fighting in the Battle of Kütahya-Eskişehir. While it was an eventual Greek victory, the Turkish army withdrew in good order to the Sakarya river, their last line of defence. Mustafa Kemal Pasha replaced İsmet Pasha after the defeat as commander in chief as well as his political duties. The decision was made in the Greek military command to march on the nationalist capital of Ankara to force Mustafa Kemal to the negotiating table. For 21 days, the Turks and Greeks fought a pitched battle at the Sakarya river, which ended in Greek withdrawal. Almost of year of stalemate without much fighting followed, during which Greek moral and discipline faltered while Turkish strength increased. French and Italian forces evacuated from Anatolia. The Allies offered an armistice to the Turks, which Mustafa Kemal refused.

On August 26, 1922, in the Battle of Dumlupınar, the Turks routed the Greek positions and launched the Great Offensive. Mustafa Kemal sent a telegram to his commanders: "Armies! Your first goal is the Mediterranean, onwards!" The Turks recaptured all of Greece's gains in the span of three weeks. The Greco-Turkish war effectively ended with the recapture of Smyrna by Turkish forces right after which occurred the great fire of Smyrna. An armistice was signed in Mudanya which finally began peace negotiations between Ankara, Athens, London, Paris, and Rome.

Peace negotiations

Second conference of London

In salvaging the Treaty of Sèvres, The Triple Entente forced the Turkish Revolutionaries to agree with the terms through a series of conferences in London. The conference of London gave the Triple Entente an opportunity to reverse some of its policies. In October, parties to the conference received a report from Admiral Mark Lambert Bristol. He organised a commission to analyse the situation, and inquire into the bloodshed during the Occupation of İzmir and the following activities in the region. The commission reported that if annexation would not follow, Greece should not be the only occupation force in this area. Admiral Bristol was not so sure how to explain this annexation to U.S. President Woodrow Wilson as he insisted on "respect for nationalities" in the Fourteen Points. He believed that the sentiments of the Turks "will never accept this annexation".

Neither the Conference of London nor Admiral Mark Lambert Bristol's report changed British prime minister David Lloyd George's position. On 12 February 1921, he went with the annexation of the Aegean coast which was followed by the Greek offensive. David Lloyd George acted with his sentiments, which were developed during Battle of Gallipoli, as opposed to General Milne, who was his officer on the ground.First negotiations between the sides failed during the Conference of London. The stage for peace was set after the Triple Entente's decision to make an arrangement with the Turkish revolutionaries. Before the talks with the Entente, the nationalists partially settled their eastern borders with the Democratic Republic of Armenia, signing the Treaty of Alexandropol, but changes in the Caucasus—especially the establishment of the Armenian SSR—required one more round of talks. The outcome was the Treaty of Kars, a successor treaty to the earlier Treaty of Moscow of March 1921. It was signed in Kars with the Russian SFSR on 13 October 1921 and ratified in Yerevan on 11 September 1922.

With the borders secured with treaties and agreements at east and south, Mustafa Kemal was now in a commanding position. The Nationalists were able to demand on 5 September 1922 that the Greek army evacuate East Thrace, Imbros, and Tenedos as well as Asia Minor. The Maritsa (Meriç) River would again become the western border of Turkey, as it was before 1914. The British were prepared to defend the neutral zone of Constantinople and the Straits and the French asked Kemal to respect it, to which he agreed on 28 September. However, France, Italy, Yugoslavia, and the British Dominions objected to a new war. France, Italy and Britain called on Mustafa Kemal to enter into cease-fire negotiations. In return, on 29 September Kemal asked for the negotiations to be started at Mudanya. Negotiations at Mudanya began on 3 October and it was concluded with the Armistice of Mudanya. This was agreed on 11 October, two hours before the British intended to engage nationalist forces at Çanak, and signed the next day. The Greeks initially refused to agree but did so on 13 October. Factors persuading Turkey to sign may have included the arrival of British reinforcements. With the British government and public firmly anti-war, the Chanak Crisis lead to the collapse of David Lloyd George's coalition government.

Armistice of Mudanya

The Marmara sea resort town of Mudanya hosted the conference to arrange the armistice on 3 October 1922. İsmet Pasha—commander of the western armies—was in front of the Allies. The scene was unlike Mudros as the British and the Greeks were on the defence. Greece was represented by the Allies.

The British still expected the GNA to make concessions. From the first speech, the British were startled as Ankara demanded fulfillment of the National Pact. During the conference, the British troops in Constantinople were preparing for a Kemalist attack. There was never any fighting in Thrace, as Greek units withdrew before the Turks crossed the straits from Asia Minor. The only concession that İsmet made to the British was an agreement that his troops would not advance any farther toward the Dardanelles, which gave a safe haven for the British troops as long as the conference continued. The conference dragged on far beyond the original expectations. In the end, it was the British who yielded to Ankara's advances.The Armistice of Mudanya was signed on 11 October. By its terms, the Greek army would move west of the Maritsa, clearing Eastern Thrace to the Allies. The famous American author Ernest Hemingway was in Thrace at the time, and he covered the evacuation of Eastern Thrace of its Greek population. He has several short stories written about Thrace and Smyrna, which appear in his book In Our Time. The agreement came into force starting 15 October. Allied forces would stay in Eastern Thrace for a month to assure law and order. In return, Ankara would recognise continued British occupation of Constantinople and the Straits zones until the final treaty was signed.

Refet Bele was assigned to seize control of Eastern Thrace from the Allies. He was the first representative to reach the old capital. The British did not allow the hundred gendarmes who came with him. That resistance lasted until the next day.

Abolition of the sultanate
Kemal had long ago made up his mind to abolish the sultanate when the moment was ripe. After facing opposition from some members of the assembly, using his influence as a war hero, he managed to prepare a draft law for the abolition of the sultanate, which was then submitted to the National Assembly for voting. In that article, it was stated that the form of the government in Constantinople, resting on the sovereignty of an individual, had already ceased to exist when the British forces occupied the city after World War I. Furthermore, it was argued that although the caliphate had belonged to the Ottoman Empire, it rested on the Turkish state by its dissolution and Turkish National Assembly would have right to choose a member of the Ottoman family in the office of caliph. On 1 November, The Turkish Grand National Assembly voted for the abolition of the Ottoman sultanate. The last sultan left Turkey on 17 November 1922, in a British battleship on his way to Malta. Such was the last act in the decline and fall of the Ottoman Empire; so ended the empire after having been founded over 600 years earlier . Ahmed Tevfik Pasha also resigned as Grand Vizier (Prime Minister) a couple days later, without a replacement.

Treaty of Lausanne 
The Conference of Lausanne began on 21 November 1922 in Lausanne, Switzerland and lasted into 1923. Its purpose was the negotiation of a treaty to replace the Treaty of Sèvres, which, under the new government of the Grand National Assembly, was no longer recognised by Turkey. İsmet Pasha was the leading Turkish negotiator. İsmet maintained the basic position of the Ankara government that it had to be treated as an independent and sovereign state, equal with all other states attending the conference. In accordance with the directives of Mustafa Kemal, while discussing matters regarding the control of Turkish finances and justice, the Capitulations, the Turkish Straits and the like, he refused any proposal that would compromise Turkish sovereignty. Finally, after long debates, on 24 July 1923, the Treaty of Lausanne was signed. Ten weeks after the signature the Allied forces left Istanbul.

The conference opened with representatives from the United Kingdom, France, Italy and Turkey. It heard speeches from Benito Mussolini of Italy and Raymond Poincaré of France. At its conclusion, Turkey assented to the political clauses and the "freedom of the straits", which was Britain's main concern. The matter of the status of Mosul was deferred, since Curzon refused to be budged on the British position that the area was part of Iraq. The British Iraq Mandate's possession of Mosul was confirmed by a League of Nations brokered agreement between Turkey and Great Britain in 1926. The French delegation, however, did not achieve any of their goals and on 30 January 1923 issued a statement that they did not consider the draft treaty to be any more than a "basis of discussion". The Turks therefore refused to sign the treaty. On 4 February 1923, Curzon made a final appeal to İsmet Pasha to sign, and when he refused the Foreign Secretary broke off negotiations and left that night on the Orient Express.

The Treaty of Lausanne, finally signed in July 1923, led to international recognition of the Grand National Assembly as the legitimate government of Turkey and sovereignty of the Republic of Turkey as the successor state to the defunct Ottoman Empire. Most goals on the condition of sovereignty were granted to Turkey. In addition to Turkey's more favourable land borders compared with Treaty of Sèvres (as can be seen in the picture to the right), capitulations were abolished, the issue of Mosul would be decided by a League of Nations plebiscite in 1926, while the border with Greece and Bulgaria would become demilitarised. The Turkish Straits would be under an international commission which gave Turkey more of a voice (this arrangement would be replaced by the Montreux Convention in 1936).

Establishment of the Republic

Turkey was proclaimed a Republic on 29 October 1923, with Mustafa Kemal Pasha was elected as the first President. In forming his government, he placed Mustafa Fevzi (Çakmak), Köprülü Kâzım (Özalp), and İsmet (İnönü) in important positions. They helped him to establish his subsequent political and social reforms in Turkey, transforming the country into a modern and secular nation state.

Historiography 

The orthodox Turkish perspective on the war is based primarily on the speeches (see Nutuk) and narratives of Mustafa Kemal Atatürk, a high-ranking officer in World War I and the leader of the nationalist movement. Kemal was characterized as the founder and sole leader of the nationalist movement. Potentially negative facts were omitted in the orthodox historiography. This interpretation had a tremendous impact on the perception of Turkish history, even by foreign researchers. The more recent historiography has come to understand the Kemalist version as a nationalist framing of events and movements leading to the republic's founding. This was accomplished by sidelining unwanted elements which had links to the detested and genocidal CUP, and thus elevating Kemal and his policies.In the orthodox Turkish version of events, the nationalist movement broke with its defective past and took its strength from popular support led by Kemal, consequently giving him the surname Atatürk, meaning "Father of Turks". According to historians such as Donald Bloxham, E.J. Zürcher, and Taner Akçam, this was not the case in reality, and a nationalist movement emerged through the backing of leaders of CUP, of whom many were war criminals, people who became wealthy with confiscated equities and they were not on trial for their crimes owing to the accelerating support for the national movement. Kemalist figures, including many old members of the CUP, ended up writing the majority of the history of the war. The modern understanding in Turkey is greatly influenced by this nationalist and politically motivated history.

The claim that the nationalist movement emerged as a continuation of the CUP is based on the fact nationalist leaders such as: Kâzım Karabekir and Fethi Okyar had been former members of the committee. However their conduct during and after the war shows that various movements were competing with each other. Kazım Karabekir had Halil Kut (Enver Pasha's uncle) deported from Anatolia during the war. Suspecting that he may reorganize the CUP through Enver Pasha's directives, Mustafa Kemal appointed Ali Fuat Cebesoy as a representative to Moscow after learning Enver Pasha was lobbying in the RSFSR as he made promises to return Anatolia during Baku Congress. In July 1921 Enver Pasha organized a congress in Batumi for former CUP members who were now Grand National Assembly deputies. They intended to seize power and expected the Kemalists would lose the Battle of the Sakarya. Due to Enver's leadership of the Basmachi movement and Djemal's visit to Afghanistan, Fahri Pasha was appointed ambassador to Afghanistan to minimize their efforts; Turkey and Afghanistan signed a friendship treaty. After the war former high-ranking CUP members were semi-active in politics until they were purged following an alleged assassination attempt on Mustafa Kemal's life. Former Finance minister Mehmed Cavid and Politician Ziya Hurşit were found guilty and executed and former members like Kâzım Karabekir were put on trial but acquitted 

According to Mesut Uyar, the Turkish War of Independence was also a civil war which took place in Southern Marmara, Western and Eastern Black Sea, and Central Anatolia regions. He states that its aspect as a civil war is pushed into the background in official and academic books as 'revolts'. The losers of civil war who neither supported sultan nor Ankara Government, which they considered a continuation of CUP, did not consider themselves rebels. He further emphasizes that casualties and financial losses that occurred in the civil war is at least as catastrophic as the war that was fought against the enemies in other fronts. Thus, he concludes that the war was similar to the Russian Revolution.

Preference of the term "Kurtuluş Savaşı" (lit. Liberation War) has been criticized by Corry Guttstadt as it causes Turkey to be portrayed as "a victim of imperialist forces". In this version of events, minority groups are depicted as a pawn used by these forces. Turkish Islamists, right-wing faction and also leftists regard this historical narrative to be legitimate. In fact, Ottoman Empire had joined the First World War with expansionist goals. The CUP government intended to expand the Empire into Central Asia. When they were defeated, however, they depicted themselves as the victims, even though war brought dire consequences for non-Muslim minorities. Guttstadt states that Turkish War of Independence, which was conducted against Armenian and Greek minorities, was an Islamist campaign as National Defense Committees were organizations founded with Islamist characteristics.

However, from the Turkish perspective, the term "Kurtuluş Savaşı" is widely defended, as the overwhelming majority of Turks view the event as a liberation from a foreign occupation. A speech delivered by Mustafa Kemal on 24 April 1920, to the newly established Ankara government, summed up the Turkish perspective of the situation: "It is known to all that the seat of the Caliphate and Government is under temporary occupation by foreign forces and that our independence is greatly restricted. Submitting to these conditions would mean national acceptance of a slavery proposed to us by foreign powers." The Treaty of Sèvres further promoted the Turkish narrative of the need to "liberate" the country. Should no action be taken, the Turkish state would be reduced to rump state in central Anatolia under heavy foreign influence.

Armenian historian Richard G. Hovannisian writes that the Italians were "currying favor" with Turkish Nationalist forces by allowing "clandestine sale and shipment of arms" to them.

Impact

Ethnic cleansing 

Historian Erik Sjöberg concludes that "It seems, in the end, unlikely that the Turkish nationalist leaders, though secular in name, ever had any intention of allowing any sizeable non-Muslim minority to remain." According to Rıza Nur, one of the Turkish delegates at Lausanne, wrote that "disposing of people of different races, languages and religions in our country is the most ... vital issue". Many Greek men were conscripted into unarmed labor battalions where the death rate sometimes exceeded 90 percent. Raymond Kévorkian states that "removing non-Turks from the sanctuary of Anatolia continued to be one of" the Turkish nationalists' main activities after World War I. Preventing Armenians and other Christians from returning home—and therefore allowing their properties to be retained by those who had stolen them during the war—was a key factor in securing popular support for the Turkish nationalist movement. Christian civilians were subjected to forced deportation to expel them from the country, a policy that continued after the war. These deportations were similar to those employed during the Armenian Genocide and caused many deaths. Over 1 million Greeks were expelled as were all remaining Armenians in the areas of Diyarbekir, Mardin, Urfa, Harput, and Malatia—forced across the border into French-mandate Syria.

Vahagn Avedian argues that the Turkish War of Independence was not directed against the Allied Powers, but that its main objective was to get rid of non-Turkish minority groups. The Nationalist movement maintained the aggressive policy of the CUP against Christians. It was stated in a secret telegram from Foreign Minister Ahmet Muhtar (Mollaoğlu) to Kazım Karabekir in mid-1921 "the most important thing is to eliminate Armenia, both politically and materially". Avedian holds that the existence of the Armenian Republic was considered as the "greatest threat" for the continuation of Turkish state, and that for this reason, they "fulfilled the genocidal policy of its CUP predecessor". After the Christian population was destroyed, the focus shifted to the Kurdish population. Ethnic cleansing was also carried against Pontic Greeks with the collaboration with Ankara and Istanbul governments.

Turkey 

The Grand National Assembly transitioned from a provisional counsel to being Turkey's primary legislative body. In 1923, ADNRAR changed its name to the People's Party. A couple years later, the name would be changed again by Mustafa Kemal to the Republican People's Party (Cumhuriyet Halk Partisi, CHP), one of Turkey's major political parties as well as its oldest. CHP went on to rule Turkey as a one party state until the 1946 general election.

Aftermath of the Çanak Crisis 
In addition to toppling the British government, the Çanak Crisis would have far reaching consequences on British dominion policy. As the Dominion of Canada did not see itself committed to support a potential British war with Kemal's GNA, dominion foreign policy would become less committed for security for the British Empire. This attitude of no commitment to the Empire would be a defining moment in Canada's gradual movement towards independence as well as the decline of the British Empire.

Influence on other nations 

The media in Weimar Germany covered the events in Anatolia extensively. Ihrig argues that Turkish War of Independence had a more definite impact on the Beer Hall Putsch than Mussolini's March on Rome. Germans, including Adolf Hitler, wanted to abolish the Treaty of Versailles just like the Treaty of Sèvres was abolished. After the failed putsch media coverage on the war ceased.

Anti-colonial movements

See also

 Timeline of the Turkish War of Independence
 Medal of Independence
 Young Turk Revolution
 31 March Incident
 List of modern conflicts in the Middle East

Notes

References

Bibliography
 
 
 Dobkin, Marjorie Housepian, Smyrna: 1922 The Destruction of City (Newmark Press: New York, 1988). .
 
 
 
 
 
 Mango, Andrew, The Turks Today (New York: The Overlook Press, 2004). .
 
 
 Pope, Nicole and Pope, Hugh, Turkey Unveiled: A History of Modern Turkey (New York: The Overlook Press, 2004). .
 

 
Wars involving Turkey
History of Greece (1909–1924)
Wars involving Armenia
Wars involving France
Wars involving Georgia (country)
Wars involving Greece
Wars involving the Ottoman Empire
Wars involving the United Kingdom
Wars involving the United States
Military history of Italy
1919 in the Ottoman Empire
1920 in the Ottoman Empire
1921 in the Ottoman Empire
1922 in the Ottoman Empire
1923 in Turkey
Rebellions in Turkey
Proxy wars
Articles containing video clips